The Dance Years is a British documentary series created by Glenn Sims and written and presented by radio DJ Dave Pearce. It premiered on 21 July 2001 on the British channel ITV. The 14-episode series focused on dance music in the UK between 1988 and 2001, with each episode charting Pearce's personal top 10 dance tracks for a particular year. The programme also explored the year's most influential people, songs and nightclubs. Each episode was broadcast on ITV on Saturday mornings at approximately 1 a.m. Dorian Lynskey of The Guardian described The Dance Years as being part of a "bumper year" for retrospectives of dance music.

The show featured talking head interviews with artists such as Double 99, Artful Dodger, Faithless, Slipmatt, Fabio, Judge Jules, Joey Negro, Sneaker Pimps, Boy George, Tony Wilson, Graeme Park, Roger Sanchez, Phats & Small and M&S. Following the TV series of The Dance Years, Pearce went on to release a set of compilation albums under the same name in 2009, and hosted a similarly titled radio series in 2012.

Episodes

See also
Similar programmes
Gonzo
NEWsic*

References

External links
The Dance Years at the British Film Institute

English-language television shows
2000s British documentary television series
2001 British television series debuts
2001 British television series endings
ITV documentaries
Television series produced at Pinewood Studios